Planet Master is the name of two fictional characters appearing in comics published by DC Comics. The first Planet Master, a scientist called Irving Norbert and his lab assistant, who would later take on the name and costume, first appeared in Detective Comics #296 in October 1961. The characters were created by writer Bill Finger and artist Jim Mooney.

Fictional character biographies

Irving Norbert

Professor Irving Norbert is a scientist who was exposed to the gases of a meteor. The result caused him to develop a Jekyll and Hyde-type personality with the bad one turning to a life of crime. Using his knowledge of astronomy, Norbert became a costumed villain named Planet Master and used weapons based on the nine planets. He managed to outwit Batman and Robin in the first battle. Norbert's unscrupulous assistant Edward Burke discovered the double identity of his boss and decided to either join forces with Planet Master or to use his equipment on his own. Ultimately though, the effects of the gas wore off. Norbert's criminal self was erased and Batman brought Burke to justice.

Edward Burke

When Kobra was creating a strike-force called Strike Force Kobra to usurp Stagg Enterprises in his goal of world domination, one of the villains he created was patterned after the original Planet Master. What makes this version different from the original is that he can simulate the abilities of the other planets. He, alongside the other members of Strike Force Kobra, fought the Outsiders and was defeated.

Although never stated, it is possible that this Planet Master is Edward Burke (who was the former assistant of the first Planet Master). Even years ago, Burke planned to use the original Planet Master's equipment in crime.

Either way, this Planet Master popped up during the Infinite Crisis storyline as a member of Alexander Luthor Jr.'s Secret Society of Super Villains where he was seen during the Battle of Metropolis alongside Strike Force Kobra teammates Zebra-Man and a somehow-revived Spectrumonster.

Powers and abilities
The first Planet Master uses weapons based on the planets.

The second Planet Master could simulate the conditions typical to any of the nine planets in the Solar System. For example, he can use the speed of Mercury, the heat of Mars, the strength of Jupiter, the rings of Saturn, and the cold of Pluto.

In other media
 A hybridized version of Planet Master appears in Batman: The Brave and the Bold, voiced by Stephen Root. This version resembles the Irving Norbert incarnation, but possesses similar powers as the Edward Burke incarnation.
 Edward Burke can be heard in the Batman: Arkham Knight DLC "A Matter of Family", voiced by JB Blanc. Throughout several audio tapes, this version is depicted as a billionaire whose daughter was dying of cancer. He was approached by Dr. Penelope Young, Dr. Harleen Quinzel, and the Joker under the alias of "Jack White" to cure her while Burke built the Seaside Amusement Park as a favor to White, though Burke's daughter died regardless. Devastated, Burke gave ownership of the park to White and was driven to suicide with pills that were later revealed to have been laced with Joker venom.

See also
 List of Batman family enemies

References

Characters created by Mike W. Barr
DC Comics characters with superhuman strength
Comics characters introduced in 1987
DC Comics metahumans
DC Comics supervillains
DC Comics scientists
Characters created by Bill Finger
Comics characters introduced in 1961
Fictional mad scientists